Jordan Gideon Archer (born 12 April 1993) is a professional footballer who plays as a goalkeeper for EFL Championship club Queens Park Rangers and the Scotland national team. Archer has previously played for Tottenham Hotspur, Harrow Borough, Bishop's Stortford, Wycombe Wanderers, Northampton Town, Millwall, Oxford United, Fulham, Motherwell and Middlesbrough. Born in England, he represents Scotland internationally, and made his full international debut in May 2018.

Club career
Archer was born in Walthamstow, Greater London. He joined Tottenham Hotspur in 2009, having previously played for Charlton Athletic. He progressed his way through the academy and signed his first professional contract in July 2011, after a loan spell at Isthmian League side Harrow Borough in the previous season. In October 2011, Archer joined Conference North side Bishop's Stortford on loan for an initial month, which was later extended until the end of the season. On 26 September 2012, Archer joined League Two side Wycombe Wanderers on a seven-day emergency loan. In November, he rejoined Wycombe on loan until January 2013. In December, Tottenham agreed to extend the loan until the end of the 2012–13 season. On 21 February 2013, Archer signed a new contract with Tottenham, keeping him at the club until 2015. He was recalled by Tottenham Hotspur on 29 March 2013, and made the bench a day later in the game against Swansea City, as cover for Brad Friedel.

Archer was released by Tottenham Hotspur on 10 June 2015 at the end of his contract. He was signed by Millwall on a two-year contract later that month. Archer was awarded the League One Player of the Month Award for the month of February 2016. The same season, Archer was awarded Millwall Player of the Season Award for his performances during the 2015–16 campaign. Archer was released by Millwall at the end of the 2018–19 season.

On 6 December 2019, Archer signed for League One club Oxford United on a short-term deal as cover for first-choice keeper Simon Eastwood. He made his debut for the club the following day, picking up a clean sheet in a goalless draw with Shrewsbury Town. He departed in January 2020, having played eight games in all competitions.

He joined Fulham on a short-term deal on 16 January 2020 but was released at the end of the season.

Following his release, he started training with newly-relegated Championship club AFC Bournemouth, and played in their Betway Cup victory over West Ham United. However, on 11 September, newly-appointed Bournemouth manager Jason Tindall confirmed that Archer would not be retained in the squad.

On 28 October 2020, Archer signed a short-term deal until January 2021 with Scottish Premiership club Motherwell, after regular first-team goalkeeper Trevor Carson went down with a knee injury.

On 5 January 2021, Archer signed a short-term deal until the end of the season with EFL Championship club Middlesbrough. On 28 May 2021, it was announced that he would leave Middlesbrough at the end of the season, following the expiry of his contract.

On 7 July 2021, Archer joined EFL Championship club Queens Park Rangers on a two-year deal.

International career
Archer was born in Walthamstow, but qualifies to play for Scotland as his grandparents were born there. He has represented Scotland at U19, U20 and U21 levels, and received his first ever call up to the senior side in August 2017. Archer made his first full international appearance on 29 May 2018, but was at fault for both goals as Scotland lost 2–0 to Peru.

Career statistics

Honours
Millwall
EFL League One play-offs: 2017

See also
 List of Scotland international footballers born outside Scotland

References

External links

1993 births
Living people
Footballers from Walthamstow
English footballers
Scottish footballers
Scotland youth international footballers
Scotland under-21 international footballers
Scotland international footballers
Association football goalkeepers
Tottenham Hotspur F.C. players
Bishop's Stortford F.C. players
Harrow Borough F.C. players
Wycombe Wanderers F.C. players
Northampton Town F.C. players
Millwall F.C. players
Oxford United F.C. players
Fulham F.C. players
Motherwell F.C. players
Middlesbrough F.C. players
Isthmian League players
National League (English football) players
English Football League players
Scottish Professional Football League players
English people of Scottish descent
Black British sportspeople